The 2017 China League One was the 14th season of the China League One, the second tier of the Chinese football league pyramid, since its establishment in 2004. The league's title sponsor was the e-commerce website 58.com.

Teams 
A total of 16 teams are contesting in the league, including 12 sides from the 2016 season, two relegated from the 2016 Chinese Super League and two promoted from the 2016 China League Two.

Team changes

To League One 

Teams relegated from 2016 Chinese Super League
 Hangzhou Greentown
 Shijiazhuang Ever Bright

Teams promoted from 2016 China League Two
 Lijiang Jiayunhao
 Baoding Yingli ETS

From League One 
Teams promoted to 2017 Chinese Super League
 Tianjin Quanjian
 Guizhou Hengfeng Zhicheng

Teams relegated to 2017 China League Two
 Qingdao Jonoon
 Hunan Billows

Name changes 
 Lijiang Jiayunhao F.C. changed their name to Yunnan Lijiang F.C. in January 2017.

Clubs

Stadiums and locations

Managerial changes

Foreign players
A total of four foreign players can be registered in a season; however, the number of foreign players is limited to three per CL1 team in the same time. Teams can use three foreign players on the field each game.

Players name in bold indicates the player is registered during the mid-season transfer window.

Hong Kong/Macau/Taiwan outfield players (Contracts signed before 1 January 2016 do not count for the foreign player slot):

Foreign players who left their clubs or were sent to reserve team after the first half of the season.

League table

Results

Positions by round

Goalscorers

Top scorers
{| class="wikitable"
|-
!Rank
!Player
!Club
!Total
|-
!rowspan=2|
| Harold Preciado
| Shenzhen F.C.
|
|-
|  Marcelo Martins Moreno 
| Wuhan Zall
|
|-
!rowspan=1|
|  Jaime Ayoví 
| Beijing Renhe
|
|-
!rowspan=1|
|  Đorđe Rakić
| Qingdao Huanghai
|
|-
!rowspan=1|
|  Cleiton Silva
| Shanghai Shenxin
|
|-
!rowspan=3|
|  Nyasha Mushekwi
| Dalian Yifang
|
|-
|  Yannick Boli
| Dalian Yifang
|
|-
|  André Senghor
| Nei Mongol Zhongyou
|
|-
!rowspan=1|
|  Babacar Gueye
| Xinjiang Tianshan Leopard
|
|-
!rowspan=2|
|  Jacob Mulenga
| Shijiazhuang Ever Bright
|
|-
|  Matheus Leite Nascimento
| Shijiazhuang Ever Bright
|
|-
!rowspan=3|
|  Ha Tae-kyun
| Baoding Yingli ETS
|
|-
|  Aboubakar Oumarou
| Shenzhen F.C.
|
|-
|  John Owoeri
| Baoding Yingli ETS
|
|-
!rowspan=2|
|  Augusto Pacheco Fraga
| Zhejiang Yiteng
|
|-
|  Dorielton
| Nei Mongol Zhongyou
|
|-

 Winner of Golden Boot.

Hat-tricks

Awards
The awards of 2017 China League One were announced on 2 November 2017.
 Most valuable player:  Matheus (Shijiazhuang Ever Bright)
 Golden Boot:  Marcelo Moreno (Wuhan Zall)
 Best goalkeeper:  Zhang Lie (Beijing Renhe)
 Young Player of the Year:  Wang Jinxian (Dalian Yifang)
 Best coach:  Juan Ramón López Caro (Dalian Yifang)
 Most popular player:  Nyasha Mushekwi (Dalian Yifang)
 Fair play award: Wuhan Zall
 Best referee:  Niu Minghui

League attendance

†

††

††
†

Notes

References

External links 
Official website 

China League One seasons
2
China
China